Boiga dightoni, commonly known as Dighton's catsnake, the Pirmad cat snake, and the Travancore cat snake, is a species of rear-fanged mildly venomous snake in the family Colubridae. The species is endemic to the Southern Western Ghats of India.

Etymology
The common name, Pirmad cat snake, refers to Peermade (also spelled Peermad, Pirmaad, Pirmed, and Pirmedu), a place in Kerala, India, elevation 3,300 feet (1,006 m).

The specific name or epithet, dightoni, is in honor of tea planter S.M. Dighton, the collector of the holotype specimen.

Geographic range
In India B. dightoni is found in the Ponmudi Hills and Travancore Hills of Kerala State, and in the Anaimalai Hills and Palni Hills of western Tamil Nadu State.and according to recent studies it may be common than previously thought in the mid-high elevation of western ghats ranging south of Palghat gap.

Description
B. dightoni is pale reddish-brown dorsally, with a series of salmon-red blotches. Its head is pale brown with minute blackish dots. Ventrally, it is yellowish, finely-dotted with brown. The outer ends of the ventral scales are salmon-pink. It is medium-sized, adults attaining a total length (including tail) of 1.1 m (3.6 feet).

Behavior
B. dightoni is arboreal and nocturnal.

Habitat

Diet
B. dightoni preys on lizards, including Calotes versicolor.

ReproductionB. dightoni is oviparous.

Venom
Although rear-fanged and possessing a mild venom, B. dightoni is not considered dangerous to humans, mainly due to its small size.

References

Further reading
Boulenger GA (1894). "Description of a New Snake Found in Travancore, by Mr. S. Dighton. Pirmaad." Journal of the Bombay Natural History Society 8: 528 + one plate. (Dipsas dightoni, new species).
Inger RF, Shaffer HB, Koshy M, Bakde R (1984). "A report on a collection of amphibians and reptiles from the Ponmudi, Kerala, South India". Journal of the Bombay Natural History Society 81 (3): 551–570. (Boiga dightoni, pp. 567–568).
Kanagavel, Arun; Ganesh, S.R. (2921). "Recent Record of the Rare Travancore Catsnake, Boiga dightoni (Boulenger 1894) (Reptilia: Colubridae), from the Ponmudi Hills in the Southern Western Ghats, India". Reptiles & Amphibians 28 (1): 67–70.
Smith MA (1943). The Fauna of British India, Ceylon and Burma, Including the Whole of the Indo-Chinese Sub-region. Reptilia and Amphibia. Vol. III.—Serpentes. London: Secretary of State for India. (Taylor and Francis, printers). xii + 583 pp. (Boiga dightoni'', new combination, pp. 359–360).

dightoni
Reptiles described in 1894
Taxa named by George Albert Boulenger
Reptiles of India